The 1988–89 OB I bajnokság season was the 52nd season of the OB I bajnokság, the top level of ice hockey in Hungary. Seven teams participated in the league, and Ferencvarosi TC won the championship.

First round

Second round

Final round

5th-7th place

Playoffs

5th place 
 Nepstadion NSzE Budapest - Lehel SE Jászberény 1:2 (7:3, 2:5, Forfeit win for Jászberény)

3rd place 
 Alba Volán Székesfehérvár - Miskolci Kinizsi 3:0 (6:5, 4:2, 4:2)

Final
 Újpesti Dózsa SC - Ferencvárosi TC 1:3 (5:2, 2:5, 6:7, 3:7)

External links
 Season on hockeyarchives.info

1988
Hun
OB